Skinners' Academy (formerly The Skinners' Company's School for Girls) is a school in the Woodberry Down (North Hackney) community for boys and girls aged 11–19. The academy opened in 2010 and is supported by the Worshipful Company of Skinners, a London Livery Company. There are currently approximately 900 pupils on roll from Year 7 - Year 11 and over 100 Sixth Form students. More than 60% of the pupils speak English as an additional language and more than 86% of students are from ethnic minority backgrounds.

In March 2017 the academy welcomed a short Ofsted inspection which resulted in the academy retaining its recognition as a 'Good' school.

History

The Skinners' Company
The Worshipful Company of Skinners (known as The Skinners' Company) is one of the “Great Twelve” Livery Companies with a history going back some 700 years. It is one of the most ancient of the City Guilds and developed from the medieval trade guild of the furriers. Members of the guild dressed and traded furs that were used for trimming and lining the garments of richer members of society.

The company, as the guild is now called, is no longer associated with the craft but continues to contribute to educating the young and helping the older in need, through their almshouses, charities and schools. The Skinners' Company's School for Girls is the fourth school that was opened by the Skinners' Company. The other schools respectively are the Sir Andrew Judd's free school (now called Tonbridge School), The Skinners' School and Sir Andrew Judd's Commercial School (now called The Judd School).

The Skinners' Company's School for Girls 
The site of the original school building (now the Upper School) in Stamford Hill was bought in 1883 for £3261 13s 2d by the Skinners' Company. The building was erected at the cost of £10,969 18s 9d and the school was opened, as a public school, in 1890 in order to meet the demand for girls' education in London. Girls started at the age of eight. At that time, the school accommodated 187 girls and 8 teachers.

During the Second World War, the school was evacuated to Welwyn Garden City. Despite this, some emergency lessons were held at the school. The school was also used to house a division of the emergency fire service. The girls also adopted a warship, sending food and clothing for its sailors.

The introduction of the Education Act 1944 led to the school becoming a state grammar school. Fees were abolished and entry was gained through the 11-plus examination.

In 1972, Mount Pleasant County secondary school merged with The Skinners' Company's School for Girls, with the male students transferring to Brooke House school and the female students joining the existing grammar school. From 1972 onwards, the school became London's first voluntary aided comprehensive school and it operated on two sites: the Upper School in Stamford Hill and the Lower School in Mount Pleasant. In 2003, the school's growing Sixth Form formed a consortium with Our Lady's Convent RC High School which it had worked with throughout the 1980s. In 2006, Stoke Newington School also joined the Sixth Form consortium which expanded upon the curriculum of the existing Sixth Form, which was established in 1927. The school was awarded specialist status in recognition of its Business and Enterprise teaching and became a Business and Enterprise College in 2004.

Skinners' Academy
In 2010, with the sponsorship of The Skinners' Company and the support of Hackney Council and The Hackney Learning Trust, the school reopened as an academy, meeting the demands of the newly regenerated area of Woodberry Down. The school opened as a mixed school accommodating ages 11–19.

Leadership
To date, Skinners' has had eight Headmistresses (as Skinners' Company School for Girls) and three Principals (as Skinners' Academy).

 Mary Hannah Page (1890–1900)
 Emily Newton (1900–1927)
 Lydia Barton (1927–1952)
 Margaret Gray (1952–1963)
 Pamela Edwards (1963–1984)
 Mary Ludlow (1984–1997)
 Jenny Wilkins (1997-2009)
 Jan Balogh (2009-2010)
 Jenny Wilkins(2010-2013) Skinners' Academy
 Tim Clark (2013–2019) Skinners' Academy
 John Beighton (2019–2020) Skinners' Academy
 Shereka James (2020–present)

School buildings and grounds
The lower school site consists of one building.

The upper school site consists of a range of buildings built at various stages of the school history.

Each serve a range of departments:

The main building (upper school) was the only building of the school when it opened in 1890. It contains administrative offices including school reception, Head and Deputy Head offices and a staff room. It also houses a library, assembly hall, canteen, and classrooms that service various departments and laboratories. This building was extended in 1893, when the gym was built and again in the 1960s when the current ICT classrooms were built.
The Art Block was built in 1964 and later extended. It contains dedicated rooms for Art, the Sixth Form facilities and facilities for those with special educational needs.
The Business Huts were built to accommodate the school's specialist business and ICT facilities.
The Science/Technology block is the newest building on the school grounds, built in 1994. This provides dedicated resources for the teaching of Science and Design and Technology.

In order to achieve the school's aim of sustainability, fruit and vegetables are grown on school grounds for use in the canteen.

At the upper school site there is a rowan tree, which was given to the school by the Skinners' School Old Girls Association. The rowan tree recognises the school's origins with the Skinners' Company, as rowan berries were used for tanning leather.

School uniform
Since the school's opening in 1890, the uniform has undergone great change. The uniform currently consists of a white dress shirt, a green/red tie (depending what year you're in), a green and grey blazer, lanyard, a green and grey jumper (optional), grey skirt/trousers, smart black shoes and a skinners rucksack/shoulder bag.

Present and future plans
The school currently operates on a split site basis, with years 7–9 in the lower school and years 10–13 in the upper school. However, due to the inefficiency and the limitations caused thereof, plans have been made to relocate the school as an academy to a single site at Woodberry Down, under the Woodberry Down Regeneration project in 2010. 
In order to prepare for the transition of sites, in the academic year of 2006–2007 the school took its final cohort of year 7s. In the academic year of 2008–2009, the lower school site shall be closed and the then years 9-13 shall be accommodated in the upper school. 
To adapt to these changes some innovative teaching and curriculum practices will be adopted, including vertical tutoring.

Academics and curriculum
The academic curriculum in the years leading to GCSE reflects the National Curriculum in its breadth and balance. The school offers a range of vocational and academic subjects at GCSE and A- Level, most notably in business studies. Of the 127 pupils eligible for GCSEs in 2007, 24.4% had special educational needs. In 2007, 28% of students achieved 5 or more A*-C Grades, including maths and English.

Student leadership

Head Boy and Head Girl
Each year, a year 12 student is elected as head girl and head boy. Their main duties encompass representing the school and the student body at various meetings and events. They also makes a speech at each year's prize giving ceremony at the school. Skinners' first Head Boy and Head Girl, Denzel Asiedu-buoh and Esin Akdogan were elected in 2016.

School Council
The school has an elected school council, consisting of one representative from each form class and the elected head boy and girl.
The school council meet on a regular basis and work together to initiate change within the school and ensure the recognition of the student voice. 
The school council has been commended by Ofsted as having
“Pupils [who] are articulate and confident. The school council is actively involved in improving life at the school.”

Prefects
Prefects from year 10 are selected by the headmaster and are given various responsibilities within the school. These include lunch time monitoring, recycling duty, and the completing of the progress book, which documents a class's behaviour. Prefects are given red badges to wear within school.

The Future
As a part of the school's transition into an academy and the school's aim of promoting the student voice, current year 8 pupils, who will be year 11s at the point of transition, have been given the opportunity to design a new sustainable building, in keeping within the Woodberry Down Masterplan.

Extracurricular
The school hosts a variety of clubs.

At present the school is part of the Urban Scholars Intervention Programme hosted at the City of London School for Girls, which supports a number of gifted and talented students, through a programme of activities. The school also works in collaboration with NFTE and last year, a group of five students won a nationwide competition for their business ‘Hennoo', their prize included a trip to New York.

The school has links with a number of businesses and companies working within the City of London, these include Linklaters, UBS, Commerz Bank, Hewlett-Packard, HSBC, and The Skinners' Company.

The school has a choir and steel pan club and they've performed at the Skinners' Hall and other venues.

Each year, Sports Day is held at Finsbury Park and all students and staff participate. In addition to this, there are a number of sporting opportunities available to staff and students. These include: football, tennis, volleyball, badminton, canoeing, and kickboxing. Yoga is also available for teachers.

Prize Giving
This event was previously known as "Speech Day", and was held each year at the Upper School. 
Each November the entire school gathers in the Round Chapel, to celebrate the school and the achievements of the year. The event is attended by the school governors and representatives from the Worshipful Company of Skinners, along with staff and the parents of the girls. The representatives of the Worshipful Company of Skinners dress in lynx fur trimmed robes in order to commemorate the Skinners' Company. Before proceeding to the stage, the beadle of the Skinners' Company knocks his ceremonial staff against the floor twice, indicating the start of the procession. Behind him walks the headmistress, who is followed by a row of school governors and a row of company representatives who bear the silver leopard statue, a symbol of the Worshipful Company of Skinners. Prizes are awarded to individuals who have performed well in their year, along with specific prizes accredited to past headteachers and the SSOGA.

Traditionally, pupils supplement applause by ‘whooping' when the recipient accepts their award. The annual report is read by the headmistress and short speeches are given by a representative from the Worshipful Company of Skinners and the Head Girl and Boy.

The Skinners' School Old Girls Association
The Skinners' School Old Girls Association has three main aims:
 To provide opportunities for Old Girls to keep in touch with their former school friends
 To provide opportunities for Old Girls to keep in touch with the school
 To provide and promote financial and/or material assistance to the school

SSOGA were disbanded in the 1980s, but were then revived in the late 1990s. 
Upon leaving school, students may join SSOGA. The SSOGA are active in the transition of the school from its current sites to the one in Woodberry Down. Members of SSOGA have been working with current students to mark the history of Skinners'. 
The committee chairperson is currently Mrs Val Griffiths. The association meet regularly and publish a quarterly news sheet, 'Our Chronicle'.

References

Secondary schools in the London Borough of Hackney
Educational institutions established in 1890
Academies in the London Borough of Hackney
1890 establishments in England
Stamford Hill